There is a very small community of Armenians in Ethiopia, primarily in the Ethiopian capital Addis Ababa. Armenians had traded with Ethiopia as far back as the first century AD.

Religion
The Armenian presence in Ethiopia is historic. On a religious basis, the Ethiopian Church and the Armenian Apostolic Church are both members of the Oriental Orthodox communion of churches alongside Coptic Orthodox, Syriac Orthodox, Ethiopian/Eritrean Orthodox and Malankara Orthodox Syrian Church (India) churches.

The Armenian inhabitants in Ethiopia are Armenian Apostolics (Orthodox Armenians) belonging to the Armenian Apostolic Church. The Armenian Apostolic (Orthodox) have their own church, Sourp Kevork (St. George) Armenian Apostolic Church in Addis Ababa. The first-ever pastor of the Armenian community was Rev. Hovhannes Guevherian.

History
Armenians had traded with Ethiopia from as early as the first century AD.

Armenians have a very old presence in Ethiopia. One of the first recorded diplomatic missions to Europe from Ethiopia was led by Matthew the Armenian who traveled to Portugal and Rome at the request of the Dowager Empress Eleni of Ethiopia to appeal for aid against Islamic incursions into Ethiopia in the early 16th century.

Besides the obvious religious affiliation, there is also the story of the "Arba Lijoch" children coming to Ethiopia after the Armenian genocide. Arba Lijoch were a group of 40 Armenian orphans who had escaped from the atrocities in Ottoman Empire, and were afterwards adopted by Haile Selassie I of Ethiopia, then Crown Prince Ras Tafari. He had met them while visiting the Armenian monastery in Jerusalem. They impressed him so much that he obtained permission from the Armenian Patriarchate of Jerusalem to adopt and bring them to Ethiopia, where he then arranged for them to receive musical instruction.

The Arba Lijoch arrived in Addis Ababa in 1924, and along with their bandleader Kevork Nalbandian became the first official orchestra of the nation. Nalbandian also composed the music for Ethiopia Hoy (words by Yoftehé Negusé), which was the Imperial National Anthem from 1930 to 1974.

The population peaked in shortly before the Italian invasion in 1935 at around 2,800. By the fall of the Ethiopian monarchy in 1974, it was around 2,000, after which the numbers fell precipitously.

References

External links
Armenians in Ethiopia - A Vanishing Community
A Journey Back in Time: History of Armenians in Ethiopia, David Zenian, Armenian General Benevolent Union magazine, 1994
Ethiopia´s Armenians – a lost Diaspora?, Markus Haile, University of Stockholm: Bachelor thesis

Ethiopia
Ethiopia
Asian diaspora in Ethiopia
Armenians
European diaspora in Ethiopia
Armenia–Ethiopia relations